Abdulai Koulibaly (born 1 January 1995 in Monrovia, Liberia) is a Liberian footballer who plays for Barrack Young Controllers FC of the Liberian Premier League as of 2017.

Career

Part of the 25-man congregation that travelled to Laos in 2015 to play for Champasak United in their local league, Koulibaly moved to Barrack Young Controllers in his native Liberia in 2017, making his national team debut against Mauritania.

During his last season at Breweries, the Liberian goalkeeper tallied 5 goals in 3 appearances, including a hat-trick facing Keitrace FC.

Honours

Liberian Second Division League: 2016
Liberian Cup: 2016
Liberian Super Cup: 2016

Awards

 Best Goalkeeper (Liberian Second Division)

References

External links 
 at National-Football-Teams

Association football goalkeepers
Living people
Liberia international footballers
Expatriate footballers in Laos
1995 births
Liberian footballers
Liberian expatriate footballers
Sportspeople from Monrovia
Barrack Young Controllers FC players
Liberia under-20 international footballers